Hitler (stylized in the film as Chiranjeevi Hitler) is a 1997 Indian Telugu-language action drama film directed by Muthyala Subbaiah. The film stars Chiranjeevi, Rajendra Prasad, and Rambha with music composed by Koti. It is a remake of the 1996 Malayalam film of the same name, and tells the story of an overprotective brother who guards his five sisters from the outside world. Released on 4 January 1997, the film was successful at the box office, ending Chiranjeevi's series of box office flops.

Plot 
Madhava Rao's mother dies when he is a child, leaving five sisters with him. His father is arrested for killing his mother by beating her in a fit of rage. Madhava hates his father but loves his sisters with a protective attitude towards them. As they grow up, Madhava is constantly worried about his sisters and tries to keep them safe. He assaults local youths who try to flirt with or even look at them. As a result, they label him "Hitler" due to his violent and domineering tendencies. Life nevertheless runs fairly smoothly in the village, though all the villagers are careful around him.

Madhava's uncle has two children; Balu, who is in love with Madhava's second sister, and Bujji, who loves Madhava and wants to marry him. One day as Madhava is out, Mohini asks Balu to come to her house, but things go badly when Madhava returns home earlier than expected and finds Balu in his house. He asks him why he is there and what is he doing, and Balu mumbles. Enraged, Madhava beats him and tells his uncle that he shall not marry his daughter. Balu and Mohini decide to elope without the consent of Madhava. Madhava disowns her. All the other sisters, having a soft spot for their sister, start hating their brother for not understanding her love for Balu.

Shortly after this, Madhava's father is released from jail. He attempts to talk to his son about his mother's death, but Madhava will not listen. He leaves to make a new life for himself. Some while later, a man who works with his father comes to Madhava and tells him that his father is in danger. Madhava's father is later murdered. Madhava discovers that his father was innocent of his mother's murder and that his uncle's business partners were behind both killings. Madhava's father has left a message asking him to take care of the two daughters he had with his second wife. Madhava brings them home. Madhava's sisters hate them and behave unpleasantly to them. When he discovers this, Madhava scolds them. In protest at his authoritarian ways, his sisters all leave the home. The villains see an opportunity to strike at Madhava and kidnap his unprotected sisters. Madhava rescues them and his sisters ask his pardon for defying him. All ends well.

Cast 

Chiranjeevi as Madhav Rao / Hitler
Rajendra Prasad as Balu / Balachandra
Rambha as Bujji
Dasari Narayana Rao as Madhava's father
Rami Reddy as Rudraraju
Prakash Raj as Chinna
Ponnambalam as Rudraraju's brother
Brahmanandam as Appala Konda
Babu Mohan as Jabar
Sudhakar as Kantha Rao
Ali in a Cameo appearance
Kitty as Aadiseshu
Achyuth as Collector
Ananth as Kantha Rao's gang
Tirupathi Prakash as Kantha Rao's gang
Uttej as Kantha Rao's gang
Narayana Rao as Prof. Mohana Rao
Kallu Chidambaram as Barber
Ashwini (Ashwini) as Sarada, first Sister
Mohini as Ammu / Annapurna, Second Sister
Padmasri as Lakshmi, third Sister
Gayatri as Gayatri, fourth Sister
Meena Kumari as Saraswati, fifth Sister
Subha as Aadiseshu's wife
Kalpana Rai as Gangamma
Y. Vijaya as Dance Teacher
Master Baladitya as Young Madhav Rao
Baby Shrestha

Production 
Editor Mohan who brought the remake rights of the Malayalam film Hitler (1996) sought to remake the film in Telugu with Mohan Babu as the lead. He approached director E. V. V. Satyanarayana to helm the remake but Satyanarayana politely rejected the offer as he was already teaming up with Mohan Babu for Veedevadandi Babu and Adirindi Alludu. Later, Chiranjeevi, who liked the script, came on board.

Soundtrack 

Music was composed by Koti. Music released by Lahari.

Box office 
The film was a box office success, having a theatrical run of over 100 days in many centres.

References

External links 
 

1990s action drama films
1990s Telugu-language films
1997 films
Films directed by Muthyala Subbaiah
Films scored by Koti
Indian action drama films
Telugu remakes of Malayalam films